The Iranian American Medical Association (IAMA), is a charitable, nonprofit organization for Iranian-American healthcare professionals and students. IAMA is formed exclusively for educational and charitable purposes.

External links
 IAMA official website
 Iranian American Medical Association: Improving Lives and Shaping Futures 

Medical and health organisations based in Iran
Iranian-American organizations